Savolainen is a Finnish surname. Notable people with the surname include:

 Heikki Savolainen (1922–1975), Finnish actor
 Jarmo Savolainen (1961–2009), Finnish jazz keyboardist
 Salomo Savolainen (1883–1964), Finnish salesperson, warehouse manager and politician
 Vincent Savolainen (born 1966), Swiss-British-French biologist

In sports:
 Antti Savolainen (born 1988), Finnish ice hockey player
 Arto Savolainen (born 1941), Finnish wrestler
 Arvi Savolainen (born 1998), Finnish Greco-Roman wrestler
 Erkki Olavi Savolainen (1917–1993), Finnish boxer
 Heikki Savolainen (1907–1997), Finnish Olympic gymnast
 Jaana Savolainen (born 1964), Finnish cross-country skier
 Juska Savolainen (born 1983), Finnish footballer
 Jussi-Pekka Savolainen (born 1986), Finnish footballer
 Kimmo Savolainen (born 1974), Finnish ski jumper
 Marko Savolainen (born 1973), Finnish heavy-weight IFBB bodybuilder
 Mykola Savolaynen (born 1980), Ukrainian triple jumper
 Ronja Savolainen (born 1997), Finnish ice hockey player
 Saku Savolainen (born 1996), Finnish footballer
 Vili Savolainen (born 1985), Finnish footballer

Finnish-language surnames